is a Japanese football player for Fujieda MYFC.

Career
After being raised by Yokohama F. Marinos youth ranks and entering first squad, he found his first pro-cap in a J3 League match: he was loaned to Fujieda MYFC for 2017 season and debuted on March 18, 2017 against FC Tokyo U-23.

Club statistics
Updated to 23 February 2018.

References

External links

Profile at Albirex Niigata 
Profile at Fujieda MYFC 

1996 births
Living people
Association football people from Aichi Prefecture
Japanese footballers
J1 League players
J2 League players
J3 League players
Yokohama F. Marinos players
Fujieda MYFC players
Albirex Niigata players
FC Ryukyu players
Association football goalkeepers